The Senegalese Air Force is the air force branch of the Senegalese Armed Forces.

History 
It was formed on 1 April 1961 with Douglas C-47s, MH.1521 Broussards, plus Sud Aloutte II and Agusta-Bell 47G helicopters. Close ties to France have been maintained with France through training and base facilities agreements.

From the early 1970s saw further French deliveries, the first jet aircraft enter service. The Fouga Magister jet trainer/ground attack as well as an SA 341H Gazelle and SA 330F Puma helicopters were delivered. During the 1981 Gambian coup d'état attempt one of the SA 330F was shot down attempting to recapture the Radio Syd transmitter outside Banjul, killing all 18 onboard.

Later expansion saw the delivery of six Fokker F27 transport to replace the C-47s from 1977, when also four SOCATA Rallye light planes were acquired. Four armed Rallye 235A Guerrier version followed in 1984.

Organization 
The Air Force's headquarters are currently located at Ouakam, near the capital of Dakar, on the opposite side of the Léopold Sédar Senghor International Airport. The air force has the role of defending Senegalese airspace, protecting airport areas, supporting other Senegalese forces, medevac and maritime patrol.

Funding remains a constant problem for the Senegalese Air Force and the increasing cost of aviation fuel restricts the number of available flying hours.

Air Force Chiefs of Staff
General Pape Souleymane Sarr
General Birame Diop
General Ousmane Kane
General Alain JC Pereira
Captain Mamadou Mansour Seck
Commander Amadou Lam
Colonel Mamadou Diop
Colonel Sidy Ndiaye Bouya
Colonel Raoul Dacosta
Colonel Amadou Fall
Colonel Tamba Meissa
Colonel Mouhamadou Diawara

Aircraft

Current inventory

References

First Senegalese KT-1s arrive

Air forces by country
Military of Senegal
Military units and formations established in 1961
Military aviation in Africa